Anastasiia Sergeyevna Dolgova (born 14 February 2000) is a Russian sprint canoeist. She competed in the women's K-4 500 metres event at the 2020 Summer Olympics.

References

External links
 

2000 births
Living people
Russian female canoeists
Canoeists at the 2020 Summer Olympics
Olympic canoeists of Russia
ICF Canoe Sprint World Championships medalists in kayak